Slyuda is the name of several rural localities in Russia:
Slyuda, Chelyabinsk Oblast, a village in Fershampenuazsky Selsoviet of Nagaybaksky District of Chelyabinsk Oblast
Slyuda, Murmansk Oblast, a former inhabited locality in Yensky Territorial Okrug of Kovdorsky District of Murmansk Oblast; abolished in November 2007
Micuda, a village in the Nagaybak district of the Chelyabinsk region.